Flamenco, also known as Ballerina Obelisk, is a cultivar of domesticated apple that bears apples good for eating fresh, and is grown for its unusual ornamental properties. The tree grows in a straight up columnar style, with many small fruit-bearing branches. 'Flamenco' is one of a series of apple tree cultivars that share a registered trademark under the name Ballerina. 

Flamenco was developed in Kent, England, between the years 1950 and 1999 by the East Malling Research Station, when they crossed a hybrid of the English Cox's Orange Pippin and the French Court Pendu Plat with the "Wijcik McIntosh", which itself is a columnar mutation of the Canadian McIntosh apple.

References

Further reading 
 

British apples
Apple cultivars